"Two Steps Behind" is a song by English hard rock band Def Leppard from their album Retro Active and the soundtrack to the film Last Action Hero. It reached number five on the US Billboard Album Rock Tracks chart, number 12 on the Billboard Hot 100, and number 32 on the UK Singles Chart. In the 1993 Metal Edge Readers' Choice Awards, the song was voted "Song of the Year" and "Best Song from a Movie Soundtrack".

Background and recording
Def Leppard recorded two different versions of the song - an electric version and an acoustic version - the widely released one was the acoustic version which featured on the greatest hits Vault. The widely released acoustic version differs from the original B-side, as it featured the addition of strings by Michael Kamen, for usage on Last Action Hero.

The song was composed and demoed by lead singer Joe Elliott in 1989 during the writing and recording sessions for the band's fifth album Adrenalize. The track was shelved for three years until it resurfaced following a late-night acoustic jamming session with the Hothouse Flowers in March 1992, which yielded three B-side tracks. When Elliott suggested recording "Two Steps Behind", Collen suggested that it be recorded as an acoustic version. The track was recorded in a few hours in April 1992 and was released as the B-side to "Make Love Like a Man" in the UK.

Later in 1993, the producers of the film Last Action Hero contacted the band requesting a new song for the film's soundtrack. As the band were on tour at the time, they were unable to record brand new material for the soundtrack. Instead, they sent the producers the multitracks to the acoustic version of "Two Steps Behind". The track was remixed and conductor Michael Kamen added an orchestral string treatment to the song. The inclusion of the song on the film's soundtrack inspired the band to create the compilation album Retro Active from B-sides and unreleased material, and record new parts to the electric version of the song on 7–11 June.

Along with the song "Let's Get Rocked" from their 1992 album Adrenalize, this is one of only two songs by the band released after the 1980s that is still regularly performed live on nearly all of the bands' tours. Def Leppard's acoustic version also features on the CMT Crossroads DVD with Taylor Swift as a bonus feature.

Critical reception
Eduardo Rivadavia, reviewing Retro Active for AllMusic, called "Two Steps Behind" along with "Miss You in a Heartbeat" "solid, but hardly groundbreaking ballads" and one of the album picks.

Music video
The music video was directed by Wayne Isham, the approximate shoot date was 10 July 1993. This video shows the band playing in car park, Joe Elliott singing on the street while all the people around go backwards and live footage at a concert. The live footage was shot on Irvine Meadows, California. The video was aired on August 1993.

Track listings
CD: Bludgeon Riffola / LEPCD 12 (UK)
 "Two Steps Behind"
 "Tonight" (acoustic version)
 "SMC"

Cassette single: Columbia / 38T-77116 (US)
 "Two Steps Behind"
 "Tonight" (acoustic version)

Charts

Weekly charts

Year-end charts

Release history

References

Def Leppard songs
1990s ballads
1993 singles
1993 songs
Music videos directed by Wayne Isham
Songs written by Joe Elliott